Yelena Nikolayevna Dergachyova (born 8 November 1995) is a Russian ice hockey forward and member of the Russia women's national ice hockey team, currently playing in the Zhenskaya Hockey League (ZhHL) with Tornado Moscow Region.

International career
Dergachyova was selected for the Russian women's national ice hockey team in the 2014 Winter Olympics. She played in all six games, not recording a point.

, Dergachyova has also appeared for Russia at one IIHF Women's World Championships. Her first appearance came in 2013, where she won a bronze medal.

Dergachyova made three appearances for the Russia women's national under-18 ice hockey team, at the IIHF World Women's U18 Championships, with the first in 2011. In 2013, she was named one of the Media all-stars of the tournament, after scoring four goals in five games.

Career statistics

International career
Through 2013–14 season

References

External links
 
 
 

1995 births
Ice hockey people from Moscow
Living people
Olympic ice hockey players of Russia
Ice hockey players at the 2014 Winter Olympics
Ice hockey players at the 2018 Winter Olympics
Ice hockey players at the 2022 Winter Olympics
Russian women's ice hockey forwards
Universiade medalists in ice hockey
Universiade gold medalists for Russia
Competitors at the 2015 Winter Universiade
Competitors at the 2017 Winter Universiade
HC Tornado players